Heteropsylla huasachae is a species of plant-parasitic hemipteran in the family Psyllidae.

References

Psyllidae
Articles created by Qbugbot
Insects described in 1914